Baby Kumari (born 1 March 1977) is an Indian politician. She is the current General Secretary of Bihar BJP and was the former State Vice President of Bharatiya Janata Party Bihar unit. She was also the member of 16th Bihar Legislative Assembly. She represented the Bochahan (Vidhan Sabha constituency) of Bihar. In the year 2015, she successfully contested the Bihar Assembly Election as an Independent candidate and defeated the then senior Minister of Bihar – Ramai Ram, nine times MLA from Bochahan constituency, with a huge margin of 24,130 votes.

Posts held

References

Bihar MLAs 2015–2020
Bharatiya Janata Party politicians from Bihar
People from Muzaffarpur district
1977 births
Living people
People from Muzaffarpur
People from Bihar